The 1995 Southeastern Conference baseball tournament was held as separate tournaments for the Eastern Division and the Western Division. The Eastern Division tournament was held at Lindsey Nelson Stadium in Knoxville, Tennessee. The Western Division tournament was held at Dudy Noble Field in Starkville, MS. Both tournaments were held from May 18 through 21.  won its third consecutive Eastern Division tournament and  won the Western Division tournament. All games played in the tournament were added to the teams' 24-game regular season conference records.

As the tournament champion with the highest conference winning percentage, Tennessee was named SEC champion and awarded the league's automatic bid to the NCAA tournament.

Regular-season results

Tournaments

Eastern Division

Western Division

All-Tournament Teams

See also 
 College World Series
 NCAA Division I Baseball Championship
 Southeastern Conference baseball tournament

References 

 SECSports.com All-Time Baseball Tournament Results
 SECSports.com All-Tourney Team Lists

Tournament
Southeastern Conference Baseball Tournament
Southeastern Conference baseball tournament
Southeastern Conference baseball tournament
Southeastern Conference baseball tournament
College sports tournaments in Mississippi
College sports tournaments in Tennessee
Baseball competitions in Mississippi
Baseball competitions in Tennessee
Sports in Knoxville, Tennessee
Sports in Starkville, Mississippi